Yundool is a locality in northern Victoria, Australia in the local government area of Shire of Moira.

Yundool post office opened on 15 November 1886, closed on 4 April 1912, reopened on 27 October 1913 and was closed on 26 April 1985.

References

External links

Towns in Victoria (Australia)
Shire of Moira